Medhat Abdelhady (born 12 July 1974) is an Egyptian football manager and a retired footballer. He last played as a defender (left fullback), and spent most of his career playing for Egyptian side Zamalek. As an international player, he was among the Egypt national football team members that participated in the 1999 FIFA Confederations Cup and won the 1998 African Cup of Nations.

Clubs career
Abdelhady scored 4 goals for Zamalek in the African Club Cups.

Honours as a player

Egypt
Africa Cup of Nations: 1998
African Games Gold Medal: 1995

Zamalek (16)
Egyptian Premier League (3)
Egypt Cup: (2001/2002)
CAF Champions League: (3)
African Cup Winners' Cup: (1)
Egyptian Super Cup (2): (2000/2001 & 2001/2002)
CAF Super Cup: (3)
Afro-Asian Club Championship (1)
Arab Club Champions Cup (1)
Egyptian Saudi Super Cup (1)

References

External links
 
 
 
 

1974 births
Living people
Egyptian footballers
Egypt international footballers
Zamalek SC players
Petrojet SC players
Kocaelispor footballers
Expatriate footballers in Turkey
1996 African Cup of Nations players
1998 African Cup of Nations players
1999 FIFA Confederations Cup players
Egyptian expatriate sportspeople in Turkey
Egyptian Premier League players
Association football fullbacks